Jim Spellman (born 1968) is an American journalist and musician.  Formerly with CNN, Spellman joined CGTN America in 2013. Before that, he also played guitar in the High Back Chairs and Julie Ocean and drums in Velocity Girl which contributed to the soundtrack for the 1995 movie Clueless.

References

External links
Pitchfork Review of Julie Ocean's Long Gone and Nearly There
Julie Ocean at Blurt Online

1968 births
Living people
American male journalists
American male musicians
Place of birth missing (living people)
China Global Television Network people
CCTV newsreaders and journalists
CNN people